The 1975 World Rally Championship was the third season of the Fédération Internationale de l'Automobile (FIA) World Rally Championship (WRC). 10 events were included on the schedule, including the return to the series of the famous Monte Carlo and Swedish rallies after a one season absence of those events. Both North American events were removed from the schedule however. Other returning entries to the schedule included the Acropolis Rally in Greece, which would become a staple of the WRC circuit to this day, and the Rallye du Maroc.

Lancia, with its powerful Stratos HF, continued its dominance despite struggling with reliability. Lancia won four rallies during the season however, outpacing competitors Fiat and Alpine-Renault. The battle for second place in the season was ultimately determined by a single point, with Fiat outscoring Alpine-Renault 61 points to 60, while Opel's Ascona made a strong bid to be competitive, scoring 58 points.

From 1973 to 1978, the WRC only awarded a championship for manufacturers. Scoring was given for the highest placing entry for each manufacturer. Thus if a particular manufacturer was to place 2nd, 4th, and 10th, they would receive points for 2nd place only. However, the manufacturer would still gain an advantage in scoring from its other entries, as the points for the 4th and 10th place entries would be denied to other manufacturers.

Calendar 

After the oil crisis of 1973 that affected the 1974 season, the Monte Carlo Rally, the Swedish Rally, the Acropolis Rally, and the Rallye du Maroc return to the calendar, while the Rally of the Rideau Lakes was dropped.

Manufacturers' championship 
Schedule of points by place:

Events

See also 
 1975 in sports

External links

 FIA World Rally Championship 1975 at ewrc-results.com

World Rally Championship
World Rally Championship seasons
1975 in rallying